Fouché or Fouche may refer to:

George Fouché, South African race car driver
 Guy Fouché (1921–1998), French operatic tenor
Jacobus Johannes Fouché, former president of South Africa
James Fouché (born 1998), New Zealand racing cyclist
Joseph Fouché, French statesman and Napoleon's chief of police
Margareta Fouché, German noble
Nicolas Fouché, French artist

French-language surnames
Surnames of French origin
Afrikaans-language surnames